TU Media Corp. was South Korea's first mobile broadcast service company headquartered in Seoul, South Korea.  Its name stood for "TV for you."  It was established in 2003 as a subsidiary of SK Telecom. SK Telecom owned 44% of the company's shares. Currently about 1.3 million people were subscribers to the service before its shutdown.

Service
TU Media Corp. provides services on the Satellite Digital Multimedia Broadcasting (S-DMB) network with full coverage for the Korean peninsula.

In April 2006, in preparation for the 2006 FIFA World Cup service was made available along the entire KTX rail system; providing a high quality reception at a travelling speed of 300 km/h.

On May 25, 2006, TU Media opened its service in the Busan Subway system.

TU Milestones
 2001 Sep. Applied for the registration to the ITU Satellite Network (by SK Telecom)
 2002 Nov. Established Wireless Test Center(Seoul)
 2003 Sep. Signed a contract with Japan’s MBCo for joint possession of DMB satellite
 2003 Dec. Established TU Media Corp.
 2004 Feb. Completed Broadcasting Center
 2004 Mar. Successfully launched DMB satellite called ‘Hanbyul’
 2004 Dec. Acquired satellite DMB business license
 2005 Jan. Began pilot satellite DMB service
 2005 May Launched commercial satellite DMB service with 7 video and 20 audio channels
 2006 May Offered 12 video and 26 audio channels
 2006 Dec. Reached 1,020,000 subscribers
 2007 Apr. Launched a data channel for traffic information
 2007 Sep. Offered 18 video and 20 audio channels
 2008 Feb. Reached 1,300,000 subscribers
 2008 Jun. Offered 21 video and 19 audio channels
 2008 Jul. Reached 1,400,000 subscribers
 2010 Nov. Merger with SK Telink
 2012 Jul. TU Media closure
 2012 Aug. S-DMB service ends.

See also
Economy of South Korea
Digital Multimedia Broadcasting
Communications in South Korea

References

External links
 TU Media Homepage

Communications in South Korea
Mobile phone companies of South Korea
Telecommunications companies of South Korea